The Italian motorcycle Grand Prix is a motorcycling event that is part of the Grand Prix motorcycle racing season. It was one of the original rounds of the Grand Prix motorcycle racing calendar. The race was held exclusively at Monza for the first 23 years of its existence. From 1972 to 1993, the event rotated among several circuits and has been held at the Mugello Circuit since 1994, except 2020 in which the race was cancelled due to the outbreak of COVID-19.

Official names and sponsors
1952, 1956: G.P. Motociclistico delle Nazioni (no official sponsor)
1964, 1973–1985: Gran Premio delle Nazioni (no official sponsor)
1986–1987, 1991, 1993–1995: Gran Premio d'Italia (was still hosted under the "Nations Grand Prix" name in English until 1990)
1989–1990: G.P. d'Italia/G.P. delle Nazioni (was still hosted under the "Nations Grand Prix" name in English until 1990)
1996–1997: Gran Premio d'Italia Polini
1998: Gran Premio Q8 d'Italia
1999: Gran Premio d'Italia IP
2000–2004: Gran Premio Cinzano d'Italia
2005: Gran Premio Alice d'Italia
2006–2009: Gran Premio d'Italia Alice
2010–2016: Gran Premio d'Italia TIM
2017–2019, 2021–present: Gran Premio d'Italia Oakley

Multiple winners (riders)

Multiple winners (manufacturers)

Winners of the Italian motorcycle Grand Prix

Winners of the Nations motorcycle Grand Prix

Notes

References

 
Recurring sporting events established in 1949
1949 establishments in Italy